Comgall mac Domangairt was king of Dál Riata in the early 6th century.  He was the son of Domangart Réti and grandson of Fergus Mór. The Annals of Ulster report his death in 538, 542 and 545, the Annals of Tigernach in 537.

Comgall
Nothing certain is known of Comgall beyond the fact of his death, but he is significant as the eponymous founder of the Cenél Comgaill, one of the kindreds of Dál Riata named by the Senchus fer n-Alban. The Senchus, in fact, speaks of the Crich Comgaill, but the Annals of Ulster use the term cenél in a report of c. 710.

The Senchus says that Comgall had one son, Conall, and that Conall had seven sons, although six are named, Loingsech, Nechtan, Artan, Tuatan, Tutio, Coirpre. It may be that Coirpe was a later addition as the Senchus speaks of the people of Coirpre as being distinct from the sons of Erc. As with all claimed early genealogies, this need not be taken as reliable information. Unlike Cenél nGabráin and Cenél Loairn, no later genealogy traces back to the Cenél Comgaill although one from the early 8th century survives appended to a copy of the Senchus.

Cenél Comgaill
The Irish annals speak relatively rarely of the Cenél Comgaill. A recent interpretation suggests, however, that the kindred may have been important in the Gaelicisation of the Picts, as a certain Dargart mac Finguine of the Cenél Comgaill married the Pictish princess Der-Ilei, and the Pictish kings Bridei and Nechtan mac Der Ilei were the result of this marriage.

The Cenél Comgaill are thought to have been centred in Cowal, which is plausibly derived from Comgall or Comgaill, and the isle of Bute. They may also have controlled the isle of Arran to the south. The royal centres of their kingdom are not certainly known. Dunoon may have been important. The late 6th or early 7th century Saint Blane was associated with Bute, but modern scholars are less certain that his traditions are authentic. The monastery at Kingarth associated with Saint Blane is mentioned in the annals. It lies close to the Dunagoil fort, which might be a plausible royal centre, but it is not clear that this was occupied in the corresponding period.

See also
Origins of the Kingdom of Alba

References

 
 
 

6th-century deaths
Kings of Dál Riata
6th-century Scottish monarchs
Year of birth unknown
6th-century Irish monarchs